Moscow Institute of Oriental Studies (abbreviated МИВ (MIV)) was a university-level educational institution that operated in Moscow, Russia, in 1920–1954. It was created as a result of merging Lazarev Institute of Oriental Languages and the Oriental studies departments in Moscow's other higher educational institutions.

When the institute was closed in 1954, its Department of Indian Languages and Department of the Languages of the Near and Middle East have been transferred into Moscow State Institute of International Relations.

Moscow Institute of Oriental Studies
Educational institutions established in 1921
Universities and institutes established in the Soviet Union
1921 establishments in Russia